What? is a party game of bluffing and guessing created by the Central African footballer David Manga. It is designed for 5 or more players, ages 14 and up. The game can be played by scoring points, playing to a certain number of ‘rounds’ or played loosely as topic cards for conversation starters at office or dinner parties.

Games Magazine named, “What?” the “Best Party Game Runner Up” for 2009 (released in December 2008 issue).

Gameplay
Each 'What?' card has three category questions that each equal one ‘round’. Question 1 is a general category with short snappy questions that always begin with “What?”.  Question 2 is the personal category where the questioner fills in the blank with someone's name. The name can be of someone playing the game, a famous person that everyone knows, or even a fictional or generic character. Question 3 is a sticky situation category where players are faced with predicaments that always end up asking, “What do you do?”.

There is one questioner who reads a question out loud to the group of players. Then everyone writes down their answer. Answers can be absolute truths or outright lies. The questioner reads all the answers out loud and chooses their favorite response. The goal is for each player is to correctly guess who wrote the response. Players who correctly guess the author score one point. If nobody guessed the author correctly, the author would score 3 points. After this round is over, the questioner returns the 'What?' card into the bottom of the pile. Then the player on questioner's left-hand-side becomes the next questioner and they must read a question from the next category. Players determine when the game ends by either reaching a set number of score-points or a set number of rounds have been played.

The player with the most points at the end of the game wins.

Equipment
Original Box:
 108 'What?' cards
 Answer sheet pad
Scoring sheet pad
 Scoring sheet shield
6 pencils

Deluxe Edition extras include:
 162 additional questions
 200 more answer sheets
 50% more score sheets
 6 more pencils
 Tin box

A French edition was also introduced as “Quoi” and includes the same equipment as the original box version.

External links
 http://boardgamegeek.com/boardgame/33208/what|BoardGameGeek.com

Party games